A pagoda is an East Asian tiered tower with multiple eaves common to Nepal, China, Japan, Korea, Myanmar, Vietnam,  and other parts of Asia. Most pagodas were built to have a religious function, most often Buddhist but sometimes Taoist, and were often located in or near viharas. The pagoda traces its origins to the stupa of ancient India.

Chinese pagodas are a traditional part of Chinese architecture. In addition to religious use, since ancient times Chinese pagodas have been praised for the spectacular views they offer, and many classical poems attest to the joy of scaling pagodas. Chinese sources credit the Nepalese architect Araniko with introducing the pagoda to China.

The oldest and tallest pagodas were built of wood, but most that survived were built of brick or stone. Some pagodas are solid with no interior. Hollow pagodas have no higher floors or rooms, but the interior often contains an altar or a smaller pagoda, as well as a series of staircases for the visitor to ascend and to witness the view from an opening on one side of each tier. Most have between three and 13 tiers (almost always an odd number) and the classic gradual tiered eaves.

In some countries, the term may refer to other religious structures. In Vietnam and Cambodia, due to French translation, the English term pagoda is a more generic term referring to a place of worship, although pagoda is not an accurate word to describe a Buddhist vihara. The architectural structure of the stupa has spread across Asia, taking on many diverse forms specific to each region. Many Philippine bell towers are highly influenced by pagodas through Chinese workers hired by the Spaniards.

Etymology
One proposed etymology is from a South Chinese pronunciation of the term for an eight-cornered tower, and reinforced by the name of a famous pagoda encountered by many early European visitors to China, the "Pázhōu tǎ", standing just south of Guangzhou at Whampoa Anchorage. Another proposed etymology is Persian butkada, from but, "idol" and kada, "temple, dwelling."

Yet another etymology is from the Sinhala word dāgaba, derived from Sanskrit dhātugarbha or Pali dhātugabbha: "relic womb/chamber" or "reliquary shrine", i.e. a stupa, by way of Portuguese.

History

The origin of the pagoda can be traced to the stupa (3rd century BCE). The stupa, a dome shaped monument, was used as a commemorative monument to house sacred relics and writings. In East Asia, the architecture of Chinese towers and Chinese pavilions blended into pagoda architecture, eventually also spreading to Southeast Asia. Their construction was popularized by the efforts of Buddhist missionaries, pilgrims, rulers, and ordinary devotees to honor Buddhist relics.

Japan has a total of 22 five-storied timber pagodas constructed before 1850.

China

The earliest styles of Chinese pagodas were square-base and circular-base, with octagonal-base towers emerging in the 5th–10th centuries. The highest Chinese pagoda from the pre-modern age is the Liaodi Pagoda of Kaiyuan Monastery, Dingxian, Hebei, completed in the year 1055 AD under Emperor Renzong of Song and standing at a total height of 84 m (275 ft). The tallest pre-modern pagoda still standing is the Liaodi Pagoda. In April 2007 a new wooden pagoda Tianning Temple of Changzhou was opened to the public, the tallest in China, standing 154 m (505 ft).

Symbolism and geomancy

Chinese iconography is noticeable in Chinese and other East Asian pagoda architectures. Also prominent is Buddhist iconography such as the image of the Shakyamuni and Gautama Buddha in the abhaya mudra. In an article on Buddhist elements in Han dynasty art, Wu Hung suggests that in these temples, Buddhist symbolism was fused with native Chinese traditions into a unique system of symbolism.

Some believed reverence at pagodas could bring luck to students taking the Chinese civil service examinations. When a pagoda of Yihuang County in Fuzhou collapsed in 1210, local inhabitants believed the disaster correlated with the recent failure of many exam candidates in the prefectural examinations The pagoda was rebuilt in 1223 and had a list inscribed on it of the recently successful examination candidates, in hopes that it would reverse the trend and win the county supernatural favor.

Architecture

Pagodas come in many different sizes, with taller ones often attracting lightning strikes, inspiring a tradition that the finial decoration of the top of the structure can seize demons. Today many pagodas have been fitted with wires making the finial into a lightning rod.

Wooden pagodas possess certain characteristics thought to resist earthquake damage. These include the friction damping and
sliding effect of the complex wooden dougong joints, the structural isolation of floors, the effects of wide eaves analogous to a balancing toy, and the Shinbashira phenomenon that the center column is bolted to the rest of the superstructure.

Pagodas traditionally have an odd number of levels, a notable exception being the eighteenth-century orientalist pagoda designed by Sir William Chambers at Kew Gardens in London.

The pagodas in Myanmar, Thailand, Laos and Cambodia are derived from Dravidian architecture.
The pagodas in Himalayas are derived from Newari architecture, very different from Chinese and Japanese styles.

Construction materials

Wood

During the Southern and Northern Dynasties pagodas were mostly built of wood, as were other ancient Chinese structures.  Wooden pagodas are resistant to earthquakes, and no Japanese pagoda has been destroyed by an earthquake, but they are prone to fire, natural rot, and insect infestation.

Examples of wooden pagodas:
White Horse Pagoda at White Horse Temple, Luoyang.
Futuci Pagoda in Xuzhou, built in the Three Kingdoms period (c. 220–265).
Many of the pagodas in Stories About Buddhist Temples in Luoyang, a Northern Wei text.

The literature of subsequent eras also provides evidence of the domination of wooden pagoda construction.  The famous Tang dynasty poet, Du Mu, once wrote:
480 Buddhist temples of the Southern Dynasties,
uncountable towers and pagodas stand in the misty rain.

The oldest standing fully wooden pagoda in China today is the Pagoda of Fugong Temple in Ying County, Shanxi, built in the 11th century during the Song/Liao dynasty (see Song Architecture).

Transition to brick and stone

During the Northern Wei and Sui dynasties (386–618) experiments began with the construction of brick and stone pagodas.  Even at the end of the Sui, however, wood was still the most common material.  For example, Emperor Wen of the Sui dynasty (reigned 581–604) once issued a decree for all counties and prefectures to build pagodas to a set of standard designs, however since they were all built of wood none have survived. Only the Songyue Pagoda has survived, a circular-based pagoda built out of stone in 523 AD.

Brick
The earliest extant brick pagoda is the 40-metre-tall Songyue Pagoda in Dengfeng Country, Henan. This curved, circle-based pagoda was built in 523 during the Northern Wei Dynasty, and has survived for 15 centuries. Much like the later pagodas found during the following Tang Dynasty, this temple featured tiers of eaves encircling its frame, as well as a spire crowning the top. Its walls are 2.5 m thick, with a ground floor diameter of 10.6 m. Another early brick pagoda is the Sui dynasty Guoqing Pagoda built in 597.

Stone
The earliest large-scale stone pagoda is a Four Gates Pagoda at Licheng, Shandong, built in 611 during the Sui dynasty. Like the Songyue Pagoda, it also features a spire at its top, and is built in the pavilion style.

Brick and stone
One of the earliest brick and stone pagodas was a three-storey construction built in the (first) Jin Dynasty (266–420), by Wang Jun of Xiangyang.  However, it is now destroyed.

Brick and stone went on to dominate Tang, Song, Liao and Jin Dynasty pagoda construction. An example is the Giant Wild Goose Pagoda (652 AD), built during the early Tang Dynasty. The Porcelain Pagoda of Nanjing has been one of the most famous brick and stone pagoda in China throughout history.
The Zhou dynasty started making the ancient pagodas about 3,500 years ago.

De-emphasis over time

Pagodas, in keeping with the tradition of the White Horse Temple, were generally placed in the center of temples until the Sui and Tang dynasties.  During the Tang, the importance of the main hall was elevated and the pagoda was moved beside the hall, or out of the temple compound altogether.  In the early Tang, Daoxuan wrote a Standard Design for Buddhist Temple Construction in which the main hall replaced the pagoda as the center of the temple.

The design of temples was also influenced by the use of traditional Chinese residences as shrines, after they were philanthropically donated by the wealthy or the pious.  In such pre-configured spaces, building a central pagoda might not have been either desirable or possible.

In the Song dynasty (960–1279), the Chan (Zen) sect developed a new 'seven part structure' for temples.  The seven parts—the Buddha hall, dharma hall, monks' quarters, depository, gate, pure land hall and toilet facilities—completely exclude pagodas, and can be seen to represent the final triumph of the traditional Chinese palace/courtyard system over the original central-pagoda tradition established 1000 years earlier by the White Horse Temple in 67. Although they were built outside of the main temple itself, large pagodas in the tradition of the past were still built. This includes the two Ming dynasty pagodas of Famen Temple and the Chongwen Pagoda in Jingyang of Shaanxi.

A prominent, later example of converting a palace to a temple is Beijing's Yonghe Temple, which was the residence of Yongzheng Emperor before he ascended the throne.  It was donated for use as a lamasery after his death in 1735.

Styles of eras

Han Dynasty
Examples of Han Dynasty era tower architecture predating Buddhist influence and the full-fledged Chinese pagoda can be seen in the four pictures below. Michael Loewe writes that during the Han Dynasty (202 BC – 220 AD) period, multi-storied towers were erected for religious purposes, as astronomical observatories, as watchtowers, or as ornate buildings that were believed to attract the favor of spirits, deities, and immortals.

Sui and Tang
Pagodas built during the Sui and Tang Dynasty usually had a square base, with a few exceptions such as the Daqin Pagoda:

Dali kingdom

Song, Liao, Jin, Yuan
Pagodas of the Five Dynasties, Northern and Southern Song, Liao, Jin, and Yuan Dynasties incorporated many new styles, with a greater emphasis on hexagonal and octagonal bases for pagodas:

Ming and Qing
Pagodas in the Ming and Qing Dynasties generally inherited the styles of previous eras, although there were some minor variations:

Some notable pagodas

Tiered towers with multiple eaves:

Dâu Temple, Bắc Ninh, Vietnam, built in 187.
Changu Narayan Temple, Bhaktapur, Nepal originally built in 4th century CE, rebuilt in 1702.
Pashupatinath Temple, Kathmandu, Nepal built in the 5th century.
Trấn Quốc Pagoda, Hanoi, Vietnam, built in 545.
Songyue Pagoda on Mount Song, Henan, China, built in 523.
Mireuksa at Iksan, Korea, built in the early 7th century.
Bunhwangsa at Gyeongju, Korea, built in 634.
Xumi Pagoda at Zhengding, Hebei, China, built in 636.
Daqin Pagoda in China, built in 640.
Bình Sơn Pagoda of Vĩnh Khánh Temple, Vĩnh Phúc, Vietnam, built in the Trần Dynasty (about the 13th century).
Hwangnyongsa Wooden nine-story pagoda on Hwangnyongsa, Gyeongju, Korea, built in 645.
Pagoda at Hōryū-ji, Ikaruga, Nara, Japan, built in the 7th century.
Giant Wild Goose Pagoda, built in Xi'an, China in 704.
Phổ Minh pagoda of Phổ Minh Temple, Vietnam was built in 1305.
Small Wild Goose Pagoda, built in Xi'an, China in 709.
Seokgatap on Bulguksa, Gyeongju, Korea, built in 751.
Dabotap on Bulguksa, Gyeongju, Korea, built in 751.
Tiger Hill Pagoda, built in 961 outside of Suzhou, China.
Lingxiao Pagoda at Zhengding, Hebei, China, built in 1045.
Iron Pagoda of Kaifeng, built in 1049, during the Song dynasty.
Liaodi Pagoda of Dingzhou, built in 1055 during the Song dynasty
Pagoda of Fogong Temple, built in 1056 in Ying County, Shanxi, China.
Pizhi Pagoda of Lingyan Temple, Shandong, China, 11th century.
Beisi Pagoda at Suzhou, Jiangsu, China, built in 1162.
Liuhe Pagoda of Hangzhou, built in 1165, during the Song dynasty.
Ichijō-ji, Kasai, Hyōgo, Japan, built in 1171.
The Porcelain Tower of Nanjing, built between 1402 and 1424, a wonder of the medieval world in Nanjing, China.
Tsui Sing Lau Pagoda in Ping Shan, Hong Kong, built in 1486.
Bajrayogini Temple, Kathmandu, Nepal, built in 16th century by Pratap Malla.
Taleju Temple,a temple in Kathmandu, Nepal, built in 1564.
Gokarneshwor Mahadev temple, Nepal, built in 1582.
Pazhou Pagoda on Whampoa (Huangpu) Island, Guangzhou (Canton), China, built in 1600.
Phước Duyên Pagoda of Thiên Mụ Temple, in Huế, Vietnam, built in 1844.
Palsangjeon, a five-story pagoda at Beopjusa, Korea built in 1605.
Tō-ji, the tallest wooden structure in Kyoto, Japan, built in 1644.
Nyatapola at Bhaktapur, Kathmandu Valley built during 1701–1702.
The Great Pagoda at Kew Gardens, London, UK, built in 1762.
Reading Pagoda of Reading, Pennsylvania, built in 1908.
Kek Lok Si's main pagoda in Penang, Malaysia, exhibits a combination of Chinese, Burmese and Thai Buddhist architecture, built in 1930.
Seven-storey Pagoda in Chinese Garden at Jurong East, Singapore, built in 1975.
Dragon and Tiger Pagodas in Kaohsiung, Taiwan, built in 1976.
The pagoda of Japan Pavilion at Epcot, Florida, built in 1982.
Pagoda of Tianning Temple, the tallest pagoda in the world since its completion in April 2007, stands at 153.7 m in height.
Nepalese Peace Pagoda in Brisbane, Australia built for the World Expo '88.
Pagoda Avalokitesvara, Indonesia, tallest pagoda in Indonesia, stands at 45 meters built in 2004.
Sun and Moon Pagodas in Guilin, Guangxi, China, twin pagodas on Shan Lake, originally built in the 10th century and reconstructed using historical description on the original foundation in 2001.

Stupas called "pagodas":
Global Vipassana Pagoda, the largest unsupported domed stone structure in the world.
Mingun Pahtodawgyi, a monumental uncompleted stupa began by King Bodawpaya in 1790. If completed, it would be the largest in the world at 150 meters.
Pha That Luang, the holiest wat, pagoda, and stupa in Laos, in Vientiane
Phra Pathommachedi the highest pagoda or stupa in Thailand Nakhon Pathom, Thailand.
Shwedagon Pagoda, a  gilded pagoda and stupa located in Yangon, Myanmar. It is the most sacred Buddhist pagoda for the Burmese with relics of the past four Buddhas enshrined within.
Shwezigon Pagoda in Nyaung-U, Myanmar. Completed during the reign of King Kyanzittha in 1102, it is a prototype of Burmese stupas.
Uppatasanti Pagoda, a 325-foot tall landmark in Naypyidaw, Myanmar, built from 2006 to 2009, which houses a Buddha tooth relic.

Places called "pagoda" but which are not tiered structures with multiple eaves:
One Pillar Pagoda: Hanoi, Vietnam, is an icon of Vietnamese culture; it was built in 1049, destroyed, and rebuilt in 1954.

Structures that evoke pagoda architecture:

The Dragon House of Sanssouci Park, which is an eighteenth-century German attempt at imitating Chinese architecture.
The Panasonic Pagoda, or Pagoda Tower, at the Indianapolis Motor Speedway. This 13-story pagoda, used as the control tower for races such as the Indy 500, has been transformed several times since it was first built in 1913.
Jin Mao Tower in Shanghai, built between 1994 and 1999.
Petronas Towers in Kuala Lumpur, the tallest buildings in the world from 1998 to 2004
Taipei 101 in Taiwan, record setter for height (508m) in 2004 and currently (2021) the world's tenth tallest completed building.

Structures not generally thought of as pagodas, but which have some pagoda-like characteristics:
The Hall of Prayer for Good Harvests at the Temple of Heaven
Wongudan Altar in Korea

See also
Architecture of the Song Dynasty
Cetiya
Chaitya
Pyatthat
Chinese architecture
Ta – Chinese pagodas
Gongbei – Chinese Muslim mausoleum with pagoda-style architecture
Tō – Japanese pagodas
List of pagodas in Beijing

Notes

References
Benn, Charles (2002). China's Golden Age: Everyday Life in the Tang Dynasty. Oxford: Oxford University Press. .
Brook, Timothy. (1998). The Confusions of Pleasure: Commerce and Culture in Ming China. Berkeley: University of California Press. 
 Fazio, Michael W., Moffett, Marian and Wodehouse, Lawrence. A World History of Architecture. Published 2003. McGraw-Hill Professional. .
Fu, Xinian. (2002). "The Three Kingdoms, Western and Eastern Jin, and Northern and Southern Dynasties," in Chinese Architecture, 61–90. Edited by Nancy S. Steinhardt. New Haven: Yale University Press. .
 Govinda, A. B. Psycho-cosmic symbolism of the Buddhist stupa. 1976, Emeryville, California. Dharma Publications.
Hymes, Robert P. (1986). Statesmen and Gentlemen: The Elite of Fu-Chou, Chiang-Hsi, in Northern and Southern Sung. Cambridge: Cambridge University Press. .
Kieschnick, John. The Impact of Buddhism on Chinese Material Culture.  Published 2003. Princeton University Press . .
Loewe, Michael. (1968). Everyday Life in Early Imperial China during the Han Period 202 BC–AD 220. London: B.T. Batsford Ltd.; New York: G.P. Putnam's Sons.
Steinhardt, Nancy Shatzman (1997). Liao Architecture. Honolulu: University of Hawaii Press.

External links

 Oriental architecture.com
 Culzean Pagoda (Monkey House) – the only stone built pagoda in Britain
 "Why so few Japanese pagodas have ever fallen down" (The Economist)
Chinese pagoda gallery (211 pics)
 The Bei-Hai (Beijing), The Flower Pagoda (Guangdong), The Great Gander Pagoda (Xian), The White Pagoda (Liaoyang)
The Songyue Pagoda at China.org.cn
Structure of Pagodas, including the underground palace, base, body and steeple, at China.org.cn
The Herbert Offen Research Collection of the Phillips Library at the Peabody Essex Museum

 

Buddhist buildings
Buddhist temples
Towers
Buddhist architecture
Chinese architectural history
Japanese architectural history
Architecture in Korea
Architecture in Vietnam
Building types
Architecture in Nepal